Route 337 is a collector road in the Canadian province of Nova Scotia.

It is located in Antigonish County and connects Antigonish at Trunk 4 with Malignant Cove at Route 245 .

It is part of the Sunrise Trail scenic travelway.

Communities
Antigonish
Morristown
Ballantynes Cove
Cape George
Georgeville
Malignant Cove
Lanark
Lakevale

See also
List of Nova Scotia provincial highways

References

337
337
Antigonish, Nova Scotia